A rigid gas-permeable lens, also known as an RGP lens, GP lens, or colloquially, a hard contact lens, is a rigid contact lens made of oxygen-permeable polymers. Initially developed in the late 1970s, and through the 1980s and 1990s, they were an improvement over prior 'hard' lenses that restricted oxygen transmission to the eye.

Rigid lenses are able to replace the natural shape of the cornea with a new refracting surface. This means that a regular (spherical) rigid contact lens can provide good level of vision in people who have astigmatism or distorted corneal shapes as with keratoconus. However, they require a period of adaptation before full comfort is achieved.

References

External links

What Are GP Contact Lenses? by Contact Lens Manufacturers Association (CLMA)

Contact lenses